The Texas–Arlington Mavericks football team represented the University of Texas at Arlington from the 1959 through 1985 season. Between 1919 through 1958, UTA competed as a junior college prior to moving to the NCAA College Division in 1959 and ultimately the University Division in 1971. UTA played its home games at multiple stadiums throughout their history with the most recent being Maverick Stadium, in Arlington, Texas.

History

The UT Arlington football team traces its roots to 1919 when the program was established at Grubbs Vocational College. By 1923 Grubbs was renamed as the North Texas Agricultural College with the football team then playing as the Junior Aggies competing in the Central Texas Conference. As the Aggies, the program captured four conference championships through the 1948 season. By 1949, the school would again change its name and mascot in competing as the Arlington State College Blue Riders through the 1950 season only to again change the mascot to the Rebels for the 1951 season. Arlington would reach their zenith as a junior college program in capturing both the 1956 and 1957 Junior Rose Bowls as national junior college champions. Following the 1958 season, Arlington State became a four-year school and begin competition as a College Division school.

After founding the Southland Conference as a charter member for the 1964 season, by 1966, the school officially became the University of Texas at Arlington. UTA won conference championships in 1966, 1967 and 1981 seasons in addition to winning their lone bowl game, the 1967 Pecan Bowl. The program would be officially disbanded after an announcement by then university president Wendell Nedderman on November 25, 1985, citing financial loss and low attendance as the primary impetus for its abandonment.

The University of Arlington Football Club fielded a team for two seasons in 2007 and 2008, with an exhibition victory of the University of South Alabama. UTA defeated USA 6-0. USA went on to field an NCAA football team.

Seasons
This listing includes only the seasons UTA competed as a four-year college beginning with the 1959 season.

Stadiums
 Memorial Stadium, 1959–1969
 Turnpike Stadium, 1970–1976
 Cravens Field, 1977–1979
 Maverick Stadium, 1980–1985

References

 
American football teams established in 1919
American football teams disestablished in 1985
1919 establishments in Texas
1985 disestablishments in Texas